Ulvi Mirzoyev (born 11 August 1976) is an Azerbaijani scientist and invasive cardiologist. He is a doctor of philosophy in medical sciences. He is known for his activities in the field of coronary angiography in Azerbaijan.

Early life and education 
Mirzoyev Ulvi Ahad oglu was born on August 11, 1976 in Baku. In 1993 he entered the medical faculty of Azerbaijan Medical University and graduated in 1999. From 1999 to 2000, he completed an internship at the Scientific Research Institute of Cardiology. From 2000 to 2004 he studied at the medical faculty of Ankara University in Turkey and received a specialist degree. In 2009, at the Cleveland Clinic in Ohio, US, he specialized in IVUS optimization of coronary interventions, transcatheter aortic valve implantation. In 2011, he specialized in transcatheter renal denervation at Heidelberg University in Germany. From 2015 to 2017, he studied healthcare organization and management at Hacettepe University in Turkey. In 2018 he received the scientific degree of Doctor of Philosophy in medical sciences by the decision of the Higher Attestation Commission under the President of the Republic of Azerbaijan. From 2018 to 2021, he studied health management at the London School of Economics and Political Science, and from 2019 to 2021 he studied at the Oxford University organizational leadership diploma program. Since 2019, he is a doctoral student at the Scientific Research Institute of Cardiology. In 2020, he graduated from Harvard University School of medicine, quality, safety, informatics and leadership program in health care. In 2021 he studied at the Frankfurt School of Finance and Management, a master's program in business organization in international health management, and completed a post-graduate course in heart failure in London.

He is married to Azerbaijani scientist, dermatologist Leyla Mirzoyeva. He has two children.

Career 
Ulvi Mirzoyev worked as a cardiologist at Istanbul Medical Park Hospital from 2004 to 2007, then he continued his work at Istanbul German Hospital until 2008. From 2008 to 2013, he held the position of head of the department at the Central Customs Hospital. He worked at Medeks Hospital in 2014, and at Grand Hospital from 2015 to 2016. Currently he is the head of the cardiology department at the Central Customs Hospital since 2017. In 2018 he became the general director of the Central Neftchilar Hospital, and since 2019 he is the head of the cardiology department of the Ege Hospital.

Scientific career 
Ulvi Mirzoyev has been a speaker at many international conferences related to the results of his scientific activities.

As a result of his activities, coronary angiography (angio) was performed from the wrist for the first time in Azerbaijan. Also, renal denervation surgery and alcohol septal ablation surgery in cardiomyopathy patients were first performed in Azerbaijan by Ulvi Mirzoyev.

He is a member of the management board of the Azerbaijan Society of Cardiology and the head of the Invasive Study group. He is a member of the European Society of Cardiology.

References 

Living people
1976 births
Cardiologists
Azerbaijani scientists
Physicians from Baku
Azerbaijani physicians
Azerbaijan Medical University alumni